Operation Michigan (1945) was a 1945 U.S. Navy operation conducted during World War II. Its purpose was intercept Japanese planes operating between Iwo Jima and Truk.

Example of use 

 USS Bering Strait

References 

Michigan